Santosh Kumar Sahu was an Indian Politician belonging to the  Indian National Congress party. He was a Member of the Parliament of India representing Orissa in the Rajya Sabha, the upper house of the Indian Parliament for 3 terms elected in 1976, 1982 and 1988.He was earlier a member of the Odisha Legislative Assembly elected in 1961 and 1967 from  Baripada.

References

External links
Profile on Rajya Sabha website

Odisha politicians
Indian National Congress politicians
1935 births
2006 deaths
Rajya Sabha members from Odisha
Members of the Odisha Legislative Assembly